Christopher Gray (22 May 1942 – 14 May 2009) was an activist in the Situationist International.

Christopher Nelson Gray was born on 22 May 1942 in London; he was raised by his grandmother in Crosby, Merseyside, and educated at Repton School.

Gray worked with Conrad Rooks on the film Chappaqua in the mid-sixties.

The Acid Diaries
For three years Gray self-administered the psychedelic drug LSD, applying the theories of  Stanislav Grof to analyse his own experiences. He also used the works of Aldous Huxley, Albert Hofmann and Gordon Wasson to develop an account of the possible value of LSD as a tool for transpersonal growth and spiritual development.

Publications 
Leaving The Twentieth Century
The Acid, published under the pseudonym of Sam by Vision Press, 2009, republished as The Acid Diaries: A Psychonaut's Guide to the History and Use of LSD (2010) London: Park Street Press

References

1942 births
2009 deaths
Situationists
People educated at Repton School
British psychedelic drug advocates
Psychedelic drug researchers
People from Crosby, Merseyside